Stagmatophora luciliella is a moth in the  family Cosmopterigidae. It is found in Colombia.

References

Natural History Museum Lepidoptera generic names catalog

Cosmopteriginae
Moths of South America
Moths described in 1877